Meryle Joy Reagon is an American civil rights movement activist born in 1942. In June 1961, she participated in a Freedom Ride from Montgomery, Alabama to Jackson, Mississippi. She is also the former wife of another Freedom Rider, Frederick Leonard and sister of Cordell Reagon.

Involvement in Freedom Ride on June 2, 1961 
Reagon was a 19 year old Tennessee State University student when she participated in a Freedom Ride from Montgomery, Alabama to Jackson, Mississippi.

The Freedom Ride began at 7:30am which was two and a half hours before Judge Johnson's ruling. The group of Freedom Riders was led by SNCC veteran, Ruby Doris Smith. The group of riders included two students from Long Island, Reagon and Charles Butler, along with three white male volunteers. Later that afternoon, Reagon along with the others including Smith were arrested in Jackson, Mississippi at the Trailways terminal, and taken to Hinds County Jail. Four hours later, her brother, Cordell Reagon would later arrive at Hinds County Jail.

References 

Living people
1942 births
African-American activists
Activists for African-American civil rights
Freedom Riders
Tennessee State University alumni
20th-century African-American women
Women civil rights activists
21st-century African-American people
21st-century African-American women